G. Ramesh is an Indian cinematographer and director, who has worked in the Hindi and Tamil film industries.

Career
Ramesh made his debut as a cinematographer with the romantic drama En Uyir Nee Thaane (1998), before working on Prabhu Solomon's Kannodu Kanbathellam (1999) and King (2002) with Vikram. Ramesh has often collaborated with cinematographer Natarajan Subramaniam and has been a part of his Hindi films, canning scenes in Paanch (2005) and Black Friday (2007), as well as in his acting debut Naalai (2006). Other notable films, Ramesh has worked on include the Dhanush-starrers Thiruda Thirudi (2003) and Pudhukottaiyilirundhu Saravanan (2004), as well as the Ajith-starrer Aalwar (2007).

Filmography
Cinematographer

 En Uyir Nee Thaane (1998)
 Kannodu Kanbathellam (1999)
 Na Tum Jaano Na Hum (2002)          
 King (2002)
 Thiruda Thirudi (2003)
 Pudhukottaiyilirundhu Saravanan (2004)
 Paanch (2005)
 Selvam (2005)
 Naalai (2006)
 Aalwar (2007)
 Black Friday (2007)
 Nesi (2008)

Director
 Kallattam (2016)
 Adavi (2020)
 Iruvar Ullam (2021)

References

Living people
Artists from Chennai
Telugu film cinematographers
Tamil film cinematographers
Cinematographers from Tamil Nadu
Year of birth missing (living people)